Paul Melicharek is a professional football defensive lineman who is currently a free agent. He was signed to the team on May 29, 2013 as a free agent.

College career

Melicharek played high school football for Glen Rock High School in Glen Rock, New Jersey. Melicharek led Glen Rock to the 2008 New Jersey State Finals in his senior year. He played college football at Bridgewater State University, a Division 3 college located in Bridgewater, Massachusetts. Melicharek was a 4-year stater for the Bears and was a 3-time All-New England Football League 1st Team All-Star. He led the Bears to a 9-1 record his senior year, and an appearance in the NCAA Division III Tournament, losing in the first round. Melicharek was chosen as a 2012 D3Football.com All-East Region 3rd Team All-Star, and a 2012 Beyond Sports Network D-III Football Honorable All-American his senior year. He was also chosen as the 2012 Joe Zablinski Award by the Greater Boston Gridiron Club, which is given annually to New England's best Division 2 & 3 college football players. Melicharek was also chosen to play in the Aztec Bowl in Monterrey, Mexico and the All-American Bowl in Minneapolis, Minnesota.

Professional career

Melicharek was not highly regarded as an NFL prospect out of college due to his small size and playing for a Division 3 college. He participated in an NFL Regional Combine in New York/New Jersey, but was not signed by any teams. Melicharek was signed as a free agent by the Green Bay Blizzard of the Indoor Football League on May 29, 2013.

References

Year of birth missing (living people)
Living people
Bridgewater State Bears football players
Glen Rock High School alumni
Green Bay Blizzard players
Lehigh Valley Steelhawks players
People from Glen Rock, New Jersey
Players of American football from New Jersey
Sportspeople from Bergen County, New Jersey